Educando a Nina (English: Educating Nina) is a 2016 Argentine telenovela produced by Underground Producciones and broadcast by Telefe from April 11 to December 1, 2016, starring Griselda Siciliani, Esteban Lamothe, Rafael Ferro, Diego Ramos and Verónica Llinás in the lead roles.

Cast 
Griselda Siciliani as Nina Peralta / Mara Brunetta.
Fiorela Duranda as Nina Peralta (child)
Esteban Lamothe as Renzo Di Caro.
Rafael Ferro as Antonio Di Caro.
Verónica Llinás as Mecha Ludueña.
Juan Leyrado as Manuel Brunetta.
Nicolás Furtado as Lalo "el Bicho" Ludueña.
Diego Ramos as Patricio Arenas.
Jorgelina Aruzzi as Susy Contreras.
Carola Reyna as Andrea Mansilla.
Enrique Liporace as José Peralta.
Martín Slipak as Salo Yepes.
Benjamín Alfonso as Tincho Massey.
Marina Castillo as Perla Bergara.
Mercedes Scápola as Milagros Alonso Sánchez.
Vivian El Jaber as Selva Juarez.
Laura Cymer as Carmela Prado.
Victoria Almeida as Sofía Lavalle.
Turco Naim as Palomo.
Federico Avalos as Tatuado.
Chachi Telesco as Magaly.
Lucas Velasco as Picky.
Carmen de la Osa as Blondy.
Noralíh Gago as Jenny.
Alma Gandini as Rosa.
Facundo Gambandé as Leonardo.
Carli Jiménez
Eugenia Alonso
Goly Turilli as Amparo
Paloma Heredia as Isabel.
Darío Barassi as Nicolás.
Julieta Zylberberg as Lola Benitez.
Violeta Urtizberea as Graciela.
Jimena Barón as Belén.

Awards

Nominations 
 47th Martín Fierro Awards
 Best daily fiction

References

External links 
  
 

2016 telenovelas
Argentine telenovelas
Telefe telenovelas
2016 Argentine television series debuts
2016 Argentine television series endings
Spanish-language telenovelas